In enzymology, a fructuronate reductase is an enzyme that catalyzes the chemical reaction

D-mannonate + NAD+  D-fructuronate + NADH + H+

Thus, the two substrates of this enzyme are D-mannonate and NAD+, whereas its 3 products are D-fructuronate, NADH, and H+.

This enzyme belongs to the family of oxidoreductases, specifically those acting on the CH-OH group of donor with NAD+ or NADP+ as acceptor. The systematic name of this enzyme class is D-mannonate:NAD+ 5-oxidoreductase. Other names in common use include mannonate oxidoreductase, mannonic dehydrogenase, D-mannonate dehydrogenase, and D-mannonate:NAD+ oxidoreductase. This enzyme participates in pentose and glucuronate interconversions.

References
 
 

EC 1.1.1
NADH-dependent enzymes
Enzymes of unknown structure